West Jesmond is a Tyne and Wear Metro station, serving the suburb of Jesmond, Newcastle upon Tyne in Tyne and Wear, England. It joined the network on 11 August 1980, following the opening of the first phase of the network, between Haymarket and Tynemouth via Four Lane Ends.

History
The station was opened on 1 December 1900 by the North Eastern Railway. The station platforms are on opposite sides of the line and are linked by an underground pedestrian subway. Platforms originally had glass awnings to shelter passengers, but these were removed in the 1970s. The remnants of these awnings can still be seen attached to the station buildings.

The station closed for conversion in August 1978, ahead of opening as part of the Tyne and Wear Metro network, re-opening in August 1980. The original station buildings were retained, but the platforms were shortened, with a new accessible footbridge was built over the line.

Facilities 
Step-free access is available at all stations across the Tyne and Wear Metro network, with level access to platform 1, and ramped access to platform 2. Between platforms, there is a ramped footbridge. The station is equipped with ticket machines, waiting shelter, seating, next train information displays, timetable posters, and an emergency help point on both platforms. Ticket machines are able to accept payment with credit and debit card (including contactless payment), notes and coins. The station is also fitted with smartcard validators, which feature at all stations across the network.

There is no dedicated car parking available at this station. There is the provision for cycle parking, with five cycle pods available for use.

Services 
, the station is served by up to ten trains per hour on weekdays and Saturday, and up to eight trains per hour during the evening and on Sunday.

Rolling stock used: Class 599 Metrocar

Notable landmarks 
The former Jesmond Picture House stood adjacent to the station, and was clearly visible from passing trains. This suburban cinema opened in 1921 and survived well into the multiplex age. Made in America was the last film to be screened there, when it finally closed its doors in October 1993. The cinema was demolished in 2009 to make way for a new office and shopping complex, after standing derelict for nearly 16 years. Plans were approved by the local council in 2008. The new building, named The Jesmond, finally opened in March 2016.

References

External links 
 
 Timetable and station information for West Jesmond

Newcastle upon Tyne
1900 establishments in England
Railway stations in Great Britain opened in 1864
Railway stations in Great Britain opened in 1980
Tyne and Wear Metro Green line stations
Tyne and Wear Metro Yellow line stations
Transport in Tyne and Wear
Former North Eastern Railway (UK) stations
